Rusere is a surname. Notable people with the surname include: 

Carlos Rusere (born 1994), Zimbabwean footballer
Langton Rusere (born 1985), Zimbabwean cricket umpire
Tinos Rusere (1945-2007), Zimbabwean miner and trade union activist

Surnames of African origin